Below is a list of television series and feature films based on characters and concepts that have appeared in Oni Press publications, including its various imprints. This list includes live action and animated television series and films.

Television

Live-action

Pilots

Film

Live-action

Reception

Box office

Critical and public reception

See also
 List of Oni Press publications

References

 
Oni Press
Lists of television series based on works
Lists of films and television series